George Williams Brown  (1894–1963) was a Canadian historian and editor. Born on April 3, 1894 in Glencoe, Middlesex County, Ontario and died on October 19, 1963 in Ottawa, Ontario.

Early life and education 
The son of Charles William Brown, a Methodist and United Church of Canada minister, and Ida Rebecca Brown, he grew up in Southwestern Ontario, Saskatchewan and British Columbia. After graduating in history from Victoria College, University of Toronto in 1915, he joined the Canadian Army but was invalided out and taught for a year in a Dukhobor community in Saskatchewan. He re-enlisted as a Lieutenant in the Canadian Tanks Corps, but World War I ended before he saw active service. After the War he taught for a year in Saskatoon Collegiate Institute and then went to the University of Chicago, where he received a PhD in history in 1924.

Career

Academic career 
He taught for one year at the University of Michigan and then in 1925 joined the History Department at the University of Toronto, where he taught Canadian and American History. In 1959 he retired and became professor emeritus. From 1953 to 1954 he was Canadian visiting Commonwealth Fellow at the Royal Institute of International Affairs and the Institute of Commonwealth Studies, University of London. He served as president of the Canadian Historical Association (1943–44) and was elected a fellow of the Royal Society of Canada in 1945. He received an honorary doctorate from the University of British Columbia in 1952. A gold medal is presented annually in his name to the top graduating history student at Victoria College.
A collection of Brown's papers, in particular with reference to his involvement with the Canadian Historical Review, is held in the York University Archives, Toronto.

Editorial career 
Throughout his career Brown was active in promoting Canadian historical scholarship. He became associate editor of the Canadian Historical Review (CHR) in 1928 and was the editor of the CHR from 1930–1946, during which time he helped set its orientation towards the study of Canadian history.  He also actively promoted the development of public archives in both the federal and the provincial governments across Canada, and he made this a priority during his term as President of the Canadian Historical Association.  One of his collaborators in this effort was his brother-in-law, Arthur Silver Morton, an historian at the University of Saskatchewan who founded the Saskatchewan Historical Public Records Office, the forerunner of the Saskatchewan Archives Board.  With Donald Creighton, the CHR associate editor, Brown conducted a survey of the state of Canadian historical scholarship in 1944 to mark the CHR's 25th anniversary.   From 1946 to 1953 he continued his editorial work as general editor of the University of Toronto Press, which publishes the CHR and other scholarly publications.

Dictionary of Canadian Biography 
In 1959, Brown became the founding general editor of the Dictionary of Canadian Biography (DCB), a position he held until his death in 1963. In setting up the DCB, he introduced two of its distinctive features. The first was to organize the volumes of biographies in chronological rather than alphabetical order. The most significant feature of the DCB was its establishment in 1961 as a partnership between the University of Toronto Press and Laval University Press, with identical volumes published simultaneously in English and French. This collaboration continues to the present day, and the DCB''' has become one of the most significant scholarly undertakings in Canada. (For a more complete account of the founding of the DCB, see the article on the Dictionary of Canadian Biography and the memoirs of the then Publisher of the University of Toronto Press.) The first associate general editor of the DCB was the historian Marcel Trudel of Laval University. In addition to the organizational work of setting up the DCB, Brown was the general editor and Trudel the associate general editor of its first volume, which was published in 1966. He also co-authored, with Jacques Rousseau, an introductory article on "The Indians of North America."

 Research and publications 

 Scholarly research 
Brown was an active scholar in his own right and a prolific writer. His most enduring academic interest was the emergence of Canada as a society and political entity, initially in North America and then in the wider world. He believed that Canadian history needed to be understood in its North American context. His early research interests were in the boundary and relationship between Canada and the United StatesBrown, George W. 1948. Growth of peaceful settlement between Canada and the United States. Contemporary Affairs No. 22. Toronto: Ryerson and Canadian Institute of International Affairs. and in the political, religious and social development of pre-Confederation Ontario,Brown, George W. Brown. 1938. "The Early Methodist Church and the Canadian Point of View" in Canadian Historical Review, vol. 17, no. 1 (March 1938): 79—96.Brown, George W. 1939b. "The Durham Report and the Upper Canadian Scene" in Canadian Historical Review, vol. 20, no. 2 (June 1939): 136—160. including the founding of Victoria College.  Later he wrote extensively on Canada's growing role in the post-World War II international environment,Brown, George W. 1954. "Canadian Nationalism: An Historical Approach" in International Affairs, vol. XXX, No. 2 (April 1954):166—174.  reflecting the prominent role played by his generation in moving Canada to full independence and international stature.

 Textbooks 
He was well known as an author of high school textbooks - drawing on his early experience as a high school teacher - and books for general audiences about Canadian history and Canada's place in the world. His book Building the Canadian Nation was the grade 10 Canadian history text in Ontario and several other provinces for over 20 years and went through numerous editions, selling over 600,000 copies. He co-authored a version for middle school students: The Story of Canada (with Eleanor Harman and Marsh Jeanneret), which was also published in French as Notre Histoire (with Harman, Jeanneret and Charles Bilodeau). This was later revised and re-issued as a two-volume Canada in North America, covering the periods to 1800  and 1800–1901.Building the Canadian Nation has been criticized for perpetuating stereotypes of French Canadians in their daily lives in New France. In this view, the stereotypes, which are traced back to the work of earlier scholars on New France and primary sources, have the effect of constructing French Canadians in the negative image of the contemporary (post-World War II) English Canadian, thus detaching them from the main narrative of Canadian history. In response, the passages in question were an effort to depict daily life in New France to students and to balance more traditional accounts that focus on leading historical figures and events. Brown's later publication of Notre Histoire with Charles Bilodeau, a respected Quebec historian, and his work as founding editor of the Dictionary of Canadian Biography, the leading collaborative effort in Canada between anglophone and francophone historians, are both reflections of his core belief that English and French Canada were founding partners.

Brown wrote several other textbooks and books of readings, including Readings in Canadian History  (the first book of original source readings for high school students – part of a move towards more evidence-based teaching of Canadian history in schools) and Canadian Democracy in Action (a high school civics text), which was later revised as Canadians and Their Government (co-authored by Allen S. Merritt).

 General interest books 
Books of more general interest included Canada (an edited volume that was part of a series on members of the United Nations) and Canada in the Making (a collection of Brown's scholarly articles, with the title drawn from his Presidential address to the Canadian Historical Association). With J. M. S. Careless, Gerald M. Craig and Eldon Ray, he co-authored a Spotlight on Canada Series for general readers on different aspects of Canada's new international role in the post-World War II era, focusing on its place in the Commonwealth, the Americas, and the World. A consolidated version of the Spotlight on Canada series was also issued in a single volume edited by Alex A. Cameron under the title Canada's Heritage.

 Personal life 
Brown married Vera Beatrice Kenny, a Victoria College classmate, in 1920 and they had two sons and two daughters. He was an active United Church of Canada layman and was a strong supporter of the ecumenical movement. He chaired the Committee on International Affairs of the Canadian Council of Churches, which for many years organized an annual Churchmen's Seminar on International Affairs..

 References 

 Books by George Williams Brown 
 Brown, George W. 1924. The St. Lawrence Waterway as a Factor in International Trade and Politics, 1783-1854. PhD dissertation, University of Chicago.
 Brown, George W. 1940. Readings in Canadian History: Original Sources from Canada’s Living Past. Toronto and Vancouver: J. M. Dent (Canada) Limited.  
 Brown, George W. 1942. Building the Canadian Nation. Toronto and Vancouver: J. M. Dent (Canada) Limited. Revised 1946, 1948, 1950 and 1958. Revised and reissued in two volumes in 1968 by Toronto: MacFadden-Bartell.
 Brown, George W. 1945. Canadian Democracy in Action. Toronto: J. M. Dent and Sons Ltd.
 Brown, George W. 1948. Growth of Peaceful Settlement between Canada and the United States. Contemporary Affairs No. 22. Toronto: Ryerson and Canadian Institute of International Affairs.
 Brown, George W., Eleanor Harman and Marsh Jeanneret. 1949. The Story of Canada. Toronto: Copp Clark.
 Brown, George W., ed. 1950. Canada. United Nations Series. Berkeley: University of California Press.
 Brown, George W., Eleanor Harman, Marsh Jeanneret and Charles Bilodeau. 1952. Notre Histoire. Toronto: Copp Clark.
 Brown, George W., J. M. S. Careless, Gerald M. Craig and Eldon Ray. 1952. Canada and the Commonwealth. Spotlight on Canada Series. Toronto and Vancouver: J. M Dent and Sons (Canada) Ltd.
 Brown, George W., J. M. S. Careless, Gerald M. Craig and Eldon Ray. 1953. Canada and the Americas. Spotlight on Canada Series. Toronto and Vancouver: J. M Dent and Sons (Canada) Ltd.
 Brown, George W. 1953. Canada in the Making. Toronto and Vancouver: J. M. Dent (Canada) Ltd.
 Brown, George W., J. M. S. Careless, Gerald M. Craig and Eldon Ray. 1954. Canada and the World. Spotlight on Canada Series. Toronto and Vancouver: J. M Dent and Sons (Canada) Ltd.
 Cameron, Alex A., editor. 1955. Canada’s Heritage. Toronto and Vancouver: J. M Dent and Sons (Canada) Ltd. [One volume consolidation of the Spotlight on Canada Series] 
 Brown, George W., Eleanor Harman and Marsh Jeanneret. 1960. Canada in North America to 1800. Vancouver, Toronto and Montreal: The Copp Clark Publishing Co. Limited. 
 Brown, George W., Eleanor Harman and Marsh Jeanneret. 1961. Canada in North America, 1800-1901. Vancouver, Toronto and Montreal: The Copp Clark Publishing Co. Limited. 
 Brown, George W. and Allen S. Merritt. 1961. Canadians and Their Government. Toronto: J. M. Dent & Sons (Canada) Limited.
 Brown, George W., general editor. 1966. Dictionary of Canadian Biography, Vol. I, 1000-1700. Toronto: University of Toronto Press.

 Selected articles by George Williams Brown 
 Brown, George W. 1926. "The Opening of the St. Lawrence to American Shipping" in Canadian Historical Review, vol. 7, no. 1 (March 1926): 4—12.
 Brown, George W. 1928. "The St. Lawrence in the Boundary Settlement of 1783" in Canadian Historical Review, vol. 9, no. 3 (September 1928): 223–228.
 Brown, George W. 1934. "A ‘Practical’ Plea" in Canadian Historical Review, vol. 15, no. 3 (September 1934): 245–247.
 Brown, George W. 1935a. "Provincial Archives in Canada" in Canadian Historical Review, vol. 16, no. 1 (March 1935): 1 – 19.
 Brown, George W. 1935b. "The Grit Party and the Great Reform Convention of 1859" in Canadian Historical Review, vol. 16, no. 3 (September 1935): 245–265. Reprinted in Ramsay Cook, ed. 1967. Upper Canadian Politics in the 1850s. Canadian Historical Readings, no. 2. Toronto: University of Toronto Press, pp. 17–37.
 Brown, George W. 1936. "The Founding of Victoria" Burwash Memorial Lecture, November 18, 1936 in On the Old Ontario Strand: Victoria’s Hundred Years. Toronto: Victoria University.
 Brown, George W. Brown. 1938. "The Early Methodist Church and the Canadian Point of View" in Canadian Historical Review, vol. 17, no. 1 (March 1938): 79–96.
 Brown, George W. 1939a. "The formative period of the Canadian protestant churches" in Ralph Flenley, editor. Essays in Canadian history: presented to George Mackinnon Wrong for his eightieth birthday. Toronto: The Macmillan Company of Canada Limited.
 Brown, George W. 1939b. "The Durham Report and the Upper Canadian Scene" in Canadian Historical Review, vol. 20, no. 2 (June 1939): 136–160.
 Brown, George W. 1944a. "The Problem of Public and Historical Records in Canada," Canadian Historical Review, vol. 25 (March 1944): 1–5. See also "‘The Discussion of the Problem of Public and Historical Records in Canada’ Report of the Annual Meeting / Rapports annuels de la Société historique du Canada" in Canadian Historical Review, vol. 23, no. 1 (March 1944): 40–45.
 Brown, George W. 1944b. "Canada in the Making: Presidential Address" in Canadian Historical Review, vol. 25, no. 1 (March 1944): 5—15.
 Brown, George W. and D.G. Creighton. 1944. "Canadian History in Retrospect and Prospect: An Article to Mark the Completion of the First Twenty-Five Years of the Canadian Historical Review" in Canadian Historical Review, vol. 25, no. 4 (December 1944): 357–375. 
 Brown, George W. 1945. "Canada and the Future of the British Commonwealth". Paper prepared for the British Commonwealth Relations Conference, 1945. Toronto: Canadian Institute of International Affairs. 
 Brown, George W. 1954. "Canadian Nationalism: An Historical Approach" in International Affairs, vol. XXX, No. 2 (April 1954):166—174.
 Brown, George W. 1955. "Canada: Trends in External Policy" in The Round Table, A Quarterly Review of British Commonwealth Affairs, No. 178 (March 1955): 178–186.
 Rousseau, Jacques and George W. Brown. 1966. "The Indians of North America" in George W. Brown, general editor, Dictionary of Canadian Biography, Vol. I, 1000-1700. Toronto: University of Toronto Press: 5—12.

 Sources about George Williams Brown 
 George W. Brown fonds, York University Library, Toronto York Library Archives
 George W. Brown fonds, Victoria University, University of Toronto 
 Careless, J.M.S. 1970. "The Review Reviewed or Fifty Years with the Beaver Patrol" in Canadian Historical Review, vol. 51, no. 1 (March 1970): 48–71. 
 Champ, Joan. 1991. "Arthur Silver Morton and his Role in the Founding of the Saskatchewan Archives Board" in Archivaria 32 (Summer 1991): 101–113. 
 Deacon, William Arthur. 1954. "Historian Brown Searches for Base Canadian Dynamic" in The Globe and Mail, January 16, 1954.
 Glazebrook, George T. 1964. "George W. Brown" in Canadian Historical Review, vol. 45, no. 1 (March 1964): 88–90
 Howarth, Dorothy. 1950. "Varsity Line-Up: Historian and Editor of University Press Son of Ontario Manse" in Toronto Telegram, January 14, 1950.
 Igartua, José E. 2008. "The Genealogy of Stereotypes: French Canadians in Two English-language Canadian History Textbooks" in Journal of Canadian Studies, vol. 42, no. 3 (Fall 2008): 106–132.
 Jeanneret, Marsh. 1989. God and Mammon: Universities as Publishers. Toronto: Macmillan and Co. Ltd.
 Osborne, Ken. 2006. Teaching History in Canadian Schools. Toronto: The Historica Foundation.
 Shore, Marlene. 1995. "‘Remember the Future’: The Canadian Historical Review and the Discipline of History 1920-1995" in Canadian Historical Review'', vol. 76, no. 3 (September 1995): 410–463.

Footnotes

External links
 The Dictionary of Canadian Biography homepage.
  The Dictionary of Canadian Biography Online, a searchable database.

Canadian male non-fiction writers
Historians of Canada
Fellows of the Royal Society of Canada
1963 deaths
1894 births
University of Toronto alumni
Academic staff of the University of Toronto
University of Chicago alumni
University of Michigan faculty
20th-century Canadian historians
Presidents of the Canadian Historical Association